Orkut Oru Ormakoot is a 2012 Indian Malayalam-language romantic drama film. The film stars Rima Kallingal, Jo Malayil (son of Sibi Malayil), Ben Alex, son of actor Lalu Alex, Anu Mohan (son of actress Shobha Mohan) and Vishnu Raghav (son of still photographer R.Gopalakrishnan).

Cast 
Rima Kallingal as Christelle a.k.a. Crystal
Ben Alex as Aby 
Jo Malayil as Ronnie
Vishnu G. Raghav
Anu Mohan as Sooraj
Siddique 
Nedumudi Venu
Jagathy Sreekumar
Suraj Venjaramoodu
Arundathi Nag

Reception 
A critic from Sify opined that "Orkut Oru Ormakkoottu tries to say lots of things, but doesn?t really succeed in doing it in an impressive way and ends being predictable, preachy and even insipid. 2011 had begun with Traffic, which had definitely raised the bar with its brilliance, but no such luck with the first release of 2012. That is sad!" Paresh C. Palicha of Rediff.com wrote that "One can only hope that Orkut Oru Ormakoot is the last film made on the worn-out theme of the abuse of the internet and the disadvantages of an urban lifestyle". Veeyen of Nowrunning stated that "With a somewhat steady first half and a haphazard second, the film is a shapeless coming-of-age caper that misses the point by a mile". On the contrary, a critic from Indiaglitz wrote that "Above all, it's a movie that doesn't bore us, a film that you can watch and remember for quite some time".

References 

2010s Malayalam-language films